Allobates masniger is a species of frog in the family Aromobatidae.
It is endemic to Brazil.
Its natural habitats are subtropical or tropical moist lowland forest, rivers, freshwater marshes, and intermittent freshwater marshes.
It is threatened by habitat loss.

References

masniger
Endemic fauna of Brazil
Amphibians of Brazil
Taxonomy articles created by Polbot
Amphibians described in 2002